Bernard and the Lion (French: Bertrand coeur de lion) is a 1951 French comedy film directed by Robert Dhéry and starring Dhéry, Gérard Calvi and Roger Saget.

The film's art direction was by Raymond Nègre.

Cast
 Robert Dhéry as Bertrand  
 Gérard Calvi as Hans  
 Roger Saget as Paulo la Paluche  
 Robert Destain as Anselme  
 René Dupuy as Le lieutenant 
 Jacques Legras as Paul  
 Franck Daubray as L'épicier  
 Jacques Sommet as Gaston  
 Capucine as La baronne  
 Frédérique Nadar as La soubrette  
 Marthe Serres as La chanteuse  
 Hubert Deschamps as François, le domestique du baron  
 Henri Pennec 
 Jean Sabrou 
 Christian Gallo 
 Raymond Mary 
 François Jacques
 Al Cabrol 
 Jean Richard as Le brigadier  
 Colette Brosset as Anne  
 Julien Carette as Le narrateur (voice)

References

Bibliography 
 Philippe Rège. Encyclopedia of French Film Directors, Volume 1. Scarecrow Press, 2009.

External links 
 

1951 films
1951 comedy films
French comedy films
1950s French-language films
Films directed by Robert Dhéry
Films scored by Gérard Calvi
French black-and-white films
1950s French films